Roger-Timothée Régnard de Pleinchesne was an 18th-century French playwright.

A former infantry captain and governor of the king's pages, Régnard of Pleinchesne wrote some dramas he presented from 1765 to 1810. He also founded, in 1781, a facility in the foire Saint-Laurent called the Redoute chinoise, which gathered in the same room various kinds of entertainment, for 30 sols, in order to attract a good company in his venue where there were games of all kinds, ring, roller, wheel fortune and swings. When this kind of distraction was exhausted, the public could indulge in the charms of a fun ride in a beautiful garden where real street singers performed the most recent songs. A café, a restaurant and a dance room amenities complemented the Redoute chinoise.

Works 
Le Charbonnier est maître chez lui, ou la Partie de chasse, pantomime (Paris 1775)
Le Malentendu, French comedy in the Italian genre in 3 acts, given at the Comédie-Italienne in Paris
La Vérité, two-act comedy, écrite à la louange du roi et de la reine
Le Prince Tiri, id.
Le Fanfaron, id.
Le B*** tiré, opéra comique
L'Épreuve de Marivaux, opéra comique
L'Heureux Engagement, one-act opéra comique 
Le Bon Médecin, five-act opéra comique
Berthe, comédie héroï-pastorale in three acts and in verse, mingled with ariettes presented at the théâtre de Bruxelles December 1774
La Guinguette, ambigu-comique
Le Degré des âges
Le Jardinier de Sidon, two-act comedy, mingled with ariettes, Comédiens italiens, 18 July 1768
Le Mariage par exemple ou les Époux à l’épreuve, one-act comedy.

References

Sources 
 Émile Campardon, Les Spectacles de la foire, Paris, Berger-Levrault, 1877, p. 304
 Frédéric Faber, Histoire du théâtre français en Belgique depuis son origine jusqu'à nos jours, t. 2, Bruxelles, Fr. J. Olivier, 1879 p. 86

External links 
 All his plays and their presentations on CÉSAR
 Roger-Timothée Régnard de Pleinchesne on 
 Roger-Timothée Régnard de Pleinchesne on Universität Bonn

18th-century French dramatists and playwrights
French opera librettists
Year of birth missing
Year of death missing